Weigendorf is a municipality in the district of Amberg-Sulzbach in Bavaria in Germany.

References

Amberg-Sulzbach